Rennebu is a municipality in Trøndelag county, Norway. It is part of the Orkdalen region. The administrative centre of the municipality is the village of Berkåk, located along European route E6. The majority of the population lives in the villages of Berkåk, Innset, Stamnan, Ulsberg, Voll, and Nerskogen.

The  municipality is the 123rd largest by area out of the 356 municipalities in Norway. Rennebu is the 257th most populous municipality in Norway with a population of 2,443.

General information

The municipality of Rennebu was established in 1839 when it was separated from the municipality of Meldal. Initially, the population was 2,368. On 1 January 1966, the parish of Innset (population: 420) was transferred from Kvikne municipality (and also from Hedmark county) to Rennebu (and Sør-Trøndelag county). Then on 1 January 1970, the Garlia area (population: 5) was transferred from Tynset (and Hedmark county) to Rennebu (and Sør-Trøndelag).  On 1 January 2018, the municipality switched from the old Sør-Trøndelag county to the new Trøndelag county.

Name
The municipality (originally the parish) is named Rennebu. Probably because two old important roads cross the municipality: one follows the Orkla river from the Orkdalsfjord (part of the Trondheimsfjord) to the village of Berkåk where it connects with the road from the Gudbrandsdalen valley and Oppdal to Gauldalen and Trondheim (today the European route E6).

Coat of arms
The coat of arms was granted on 19 February 1982. The official blazon is "Or, a pall reversed couped gules". This means the arms have a field (background) has a tincture of Or which means it is commonly colored yellow, but if it is made out of metal, then gold is used. The charge is a Y-shaped design in red. The design symbolizes the outline of the local church, Rennebu kirke (erected 1669), which is one of the oldest (and very few) churches in Norway based on a Y-shaped outline. The arms were designed by Bjørn Casper Horgen after an idea by Magne Jostein Hoel. The municipal flag has the same design as the coat of arms.

Churches
The Church of Norway has three parishes within the municipality of Rennebu. It is part of the Gauldal prosti (deanery) in the Diocese of Nidaros.

Geography

Rennebu mainly consists of uncultivated areas of mountains, lakes, moors, and forests. The mountain Ilfjellet is located in the northeastern part of the municipality.

The Orkla River flows through the municipality from south to north in the Orkdalen valley. The northeasternmost part of the Trollheimen mountain range also lies within the municipality of Rennebu.

The municipality is surrounded by the municipalities of Oppdal and Rindal to the west, Meldal to the north, Midtre Gauldal to the east, and Tynset to the south. The Forollhogna National Park lies in the extreme southeastern part of the municipality.

Climate
Situated at some altitude inland in mid-Norway, Rennebu has a boreal climate. 10 of the 12 record lows are from 1967 or older. The all-time low   is from February 1953. The most recent record low is August from 1987. The all-time high  is from July 1991. Snow depth recording in Berkåk (475 m) shows that Berkåk on average has 138 days/year with at least 25 cm snow on the ground (base period 1991–2008).

Government
All municipalities in Norway, including Rennebu, are responsible for primary education (through 10th grade), outpatient health services, senior citizen services, unemployment and other social services, zoning, economic development, and municipal roads. The municipality is governed by a municipal council of elected representatives, which in turn elect a mayor. The municipality falls under the Trøndelag District Court and the Frostating Court of Appeal.

Municipal council
The municipal council of Rennebu is made up of 21 representatives that are elected to four year terms. The party breakdown of the council is as follows:

Mayors
The mayors of Rennebu:

1839–1845: Ingebrigt Trondsen Eggan 
1846–1849: Engel Meslo 
1850–1851: Ole Olsen 
1852–1853: Ingebrigt Stavne, Sr.
1854–1857: Engel Meslo 
1858–1859: Torger Rise 
1860-1860: Mikkel Kosberg 
1860–1861: Ingebrigt Stavne, Sr.
1862–1863: Torger Rise 
1864–1867: Johan Fredrik Jørgen Schwabe 
1868–1871: Einar Hoel 
1872–1877: Ingebrigt Meslo 
1878–1881: Arnt Johnsen Mærk 
1882–1893: Ingebrigt Meslo (MV)
1894–1903: Trond Trondsen Eggan (V)
1903–1904: Sivert Gunnes (V)
1905–1907: Ingebrigt Stavne, Jr. (V)
1908–1913: Sivert Gunnes (V)
1914–1922: Angrim Brattset (V)
1923–1925: Mikkel Voll (V)
1926–1931: Ola Mikkelsen Gunnes (V)
1932–1934: Jon Gunnes (V)
1935–1937: Karl Johnson (V)
1938–1942: Erik Myrmo (Bp)
1942–1945: Inge Clett Mull (NS)
1945-1945: Erik Myrmo (Bp)
1946–1947: Arnt Kjelland (V)
1948–1951: Karl Johnson (V)
1952–1955: Ingebrigt Haugset (Bp)
1956–1959: John M. Meslo (V)
1960–1965: Jens P. Flå (KrF)
1965–1967: Torleif Sundset (V)
1968–1973: Jens P. Flå (KrF)
1973–1975: Kåre Kleven (Sp)
1976–1985: Magne Jostein Hoel (Sp)
1986–1991: Alf Gunnes (KrF)
1992–1995: Magne Jostein Hoel (Sp)
1995–1999: Tora Husan (KrF)
1999–2006: Trond Jære (Sp)
2006–2011: Bjørn Rogstad (H)
2011–2015: Ola T. Lånke (KrF)
2015–present: Ola Øie (Ap)

Notable people 

 Jürgen Christoph von Koppelow (1684 in Rennebu – 1770) a Norwegian nobleman and military officer
 Jens P. Flå (born 1923 in Rennebu - 2002) a politician, Mayor of Rennebu 1959 to 1969
 Heidi Skjerve (born 1979 in Rennebu) a Norwegian jazz singer and composer
 Astrid Smeplass (born 1996 in Berkåk) a Norwegian singer and songwriter; stage name Astrid S

Sport 
 Magne Myrmo (born 1943 in Rennebu) a former cross-country skier, silver medallist at the 1972 Winter Olympics
 Vebjørn Rodal (born 1972 in Berkåk) a former 800m. runner, gold medallist at the 1996 Summer Olympics
 Vegard Skjerve (born 1988 in Rennebu) a retired Norwegian footballer with 276 caps with FK Haugesund
 Jo Sondre Aas (born 1989 in Grindal) a Norwegian football player with over 330 club caps

References

External links

Municipal fact sheet from Statistics Norway 

 
Municipalities of Trøndelag
1839 establishments in Norway